Yu Cong Eng v. Trinidad, 271 U.S. 500 (1926), was a United States Supreme Court case in which the Court held that a law passed by the US colonial government of the Philippines in 1921, Act No. 2972 of the Philippine Legislature, known as the "Chinese Bookkeeping Act", was unconstitutional. It prevented business records from being kept in the Chinese language.

External links
 
Excerpts from the text of the Supreme Court decision

1926 in United States case law
Legal history of the Philippines
Linguistic rights
United States Supreme Court cases
United States Supreme Court cases of the Taft Court
China–Philippines relations
Anti-Chinese sentiment in the United States
History of Manila
History of the Philippines (1898–1946)